Frank Dixon Cox (28 May 1940 – 27 April 2021) was a British television director from the 1960s to the 1990s. He was married to actress Bridget Turner until her death in 2014.

Cox studied English at the University of Leeds from which he graduated in 1962. He did not get into the Royal Academy of Dramatic Art (RADA), but took a job as a floor assistant at the BBC. He was then offered a position on the BBC's training course for directors. Among his first assignments were three episodes of the first season of Doctor Who.

Of all the directors who worked on the 1963 to 1989 run of Doctor Who, Cox was the only one who did not direct an entire serial at some stage.

He died in April 2021 at the age of 80.

Filmography

Director
Doctor Who
The Edge of Destruction (Episode two - The Brink of Disaster) - 1964
The Sensorites (Episode five - Kidnap, and Episode six - A Desperate Venture) - 1964
The Troubleshooters - 1965
The First Lady - 1968
Doomwatch - 1970
Paul Temple
Catch Your Death - 1971
The View from Daniel Pike - 1971
Sutherland's Law - 1973
Warship - 1973
Play for Today
Take the High Road - 1984, 1989–1991
PQ17 - 1981
Taggart - 1994

Producer
Sutherland's Law - 1973-1976
The End of the Good Times - 1975
Take the High Road - 1991-1993
Escape - 1980
C.A.T.S. Eyes - 1985

Self
Over The Edge - 2006
Inside the Spaceship - 2006

References

External links

1940 births
2021 deaths
British television directors
People from London